The mixed doubles badminton event at the 2014 Commonwealth Games was held between July 29 and August 3 at the Emirates Arena in Glasgow.

Seeds 
The seeds for the tournament were:

Draw

Finals

Top Half

Section 1

Section 2

Bottom Half

Section 3

Section 4

References

Mixed Doubles
Commonwealth